Dioh Williams (born 8 October 1984) is a Liberian former professional footballer who played as a forward. He mostly spent his career in Sweden, representing top tier clubs BK Häcken and Gefle IF. He has also played for clubs in Denmark and Russia. Williams was a member of the Liberia national team.

Club career

Floda BoIF
Dioh Williams was one of several Liberian footballers who were brought to Sweden by Floda Bolf by manager Stig Johanasson in the late 1990s after having been discovered at the Gothia Cup. These Liberian players included Dulee Johnson, Natus Ponnie, Jimmy Dixon and Stephen Hills.

BK Hacken
During the 2003 season, Dioh transferred to Allsvenska club, BK Hacken, from Floda Bolf. Dioh had success at BK Hacken and became the Allsvenska-recognized top scorer with 20 goals during the 2006–2007 season. Dioh was a regular starter for the entire four years with BK Haken.

AGF Aarhus
In the summer of 2007, Dioh transfer from BK Hacken to Danish Superliga club AGF Aarhus for 1,10 Million euros and signed a 4 years contract. Dioh became an instant hit and scored regularly for AGF Aarhus.

Alania Vladikavkaz
Dioh was loaned from AGF Aarhus to Russian Premier League club Alania Vladikavkaz during the 2010–2011 season.

BK Hacken
On 1 January 2011, Dioh returned to his previous club BK Hacken and signed a 36-month contract.

Gefle IF
On 14 February 2014, Dioh transfer from BK Hacken to Gefle IF for an undisclosed fee and signed a three-year contract. Dioh was a regular goal scorer at Gefle IF and had a successful three season at the club.

T.C. Sports Club
On 28 February 2018, Williams signed with T.C. Sports Club in the Dhivehi Premier League on a free transfer.

International career
Dioh became a member of Liberia national team in 2004. He represented Liberia in 2006 FIFA World Cup qualification matches, as well as the qualifying competition for the 2008 African Cup of Nations.

References

External links
 
 
 Official Danish Superliga stats
 
 

1984 births
Living people
Liberian footballers
Liberia international footballers
Floda BoIF players
Gefle IF players
Aarhus Gymnastikforening players
Danish Superliga players
Allsvenskan players
Liberian expatriate footballers
Expatriate men's footballers in Denmark
Association football forwards
Expatriate footballers in Russia
Russian Premier League players
FC Spartak Vladikavkaz players
Sportspeople from Monrovia
Expatriate footballers in Sweden
T.C. Sports Club players